Andrew Harold Gibson was the commissioner of Yukon from 1950 to 1951. He was preceded by John Edward Gibben and succeeded by Frederick Fraser. He died in 1971 in Whitehouse Territory, Yukon, Canada.

References

Commissioners of Yukon
1883 births
1971 deaths
People from Lanark County